Adele Eva Goldberg (born 1963) is an American linguist known for her development of construction grammar and the constructionist approach in the tradition of cognitive linguistics.

Early life
Goldberg  grew up in Bethlehem, Pennsylvania where her mother was a reading teacher and her father was an engineer. Her brother,  Ken Y. Goldberg is chair of the industrial engineering and operations research department at the University of California, Berkeley,  and her sister, Elena is a pediatrician and child psychologist in Brooklyn.

Academic career 
Goldberg received a B.A. in Mathematics and Philosophy from University of Pennsylvania in 1985 before spending two years in the Logic and Methodology of Science program at University of California at Berkeley. She then transferred to linguistics to work with George Lakoff and earned her PhD in linguistics in 1992, studying with Lakoff, Eve Sweetser, Charles Fillmore, and Dan Slobin. Her thesis argues that basic grammatical patterns in English are directly associated with meaning, offering one of the earliest arguments that constructions as well as words contribute to propositional content.

She has continued to work on the relationship between form and function in language in language processing, and language learning by children and adults. 

After receiving her PhD, Goldberg joined the University of California, San Diego as an Assistant Professor of Linguistics (1992-1997), and Associate Professor o(1997-1998). From 1997 to 2004, she was Associate Professor of Linguistics at the Beckman Institute, University of Illinois at Urbana–Champaign before moving to Princeton University in 2004 as Professor of Psychology and Linguistics.

She is currently Chair of the international Cognitive Science Society.

Selected publications

Awards and honors                                                       
 Fellow, Association of Psychological Science (2020)                                                          
 Fillmore Professorship, Linguistic Society of America Institute (2019)
 Labex International Chair, Paris, France. (2016)
 Humboldt Research Award (2016)
 Fellow of the Linguistic Society of America (2014)
 Visiting Fellow, Einstein Foundation. Freie Universitat, Berlin. (2010–2014)
 Fellow at Center for Advanced Study of Behavioral Sciences. Stanford, California. (2003–2004)
 Fellow of the Center for Advanced Study, UIUC. (2000)
 Gustave O. Arlt Book Award. North American Graduate Council for Constructions (1995).

Personal life
Goldberg married Ali Yazdani, currently a professor of physics at Princeton, in 1994 and they have two children.

References

External links
 Official homepage at Princeton University

1963 births
Living people
Linguists from the United States
Women linguists
American cognitive scientists
Syntacticians
Women cognitive scientists
Place of birth missing (living people)
Developmental psycholinguists
Humboldt Research Award recipients
Fellows of the Linguistic Society of America
University of California, Berkeley alumni
Princeton University faculty